Leohumicola levissima is a species of fungi. It is named after the smooth walled appearance of its terminal conidial cells (levissima is Latin for "smooth"). It was first found in Crater Lake National Park, Oregon. The terminal cell of this species’ conidia remains smooth even after 3 months’ time, as opposed to the encrusted terminal cells of L. verrucosa and L. incrustata. Conidia of L. atra have similarly smooth terminal cells, but which are darker.

Description
Its conidiogenous hyphae are hyaline, measuring approximately 1–2μm wide, often found in fascicles in aerial mycelium. These are reduced to a single denticle that is 0.5–1.5μm long and 1.0–3.5μm wide. Conidia are two-celled, either solitary or distributed side by side in clusters. Its terminal cell is 4.5–6.0 by 4.0–5.5μm, being globose to subglobose, transitioning to a dark brown colour; its conidial walls are slightly thick. Chlamydospores are sparsely produced, being intercalary, single, and the same colour as the conidial terminal cell. The vegetative mycelium often carry swollen, monilioid hyphae that are 1 to 2μm wide, septate, and show thickened walls.

References

Further reading
Chen, Juan, et al. "Leohumicola, a genus new to China." Mycotaxon 108.1 (2009): 337–340.

External links

MycoBank

Leotiomycetes
Fungal plant pathogens and diseases